Arena Lviv is a football stadium in Lviv, Ukraine. It was one of the eight UEFA Euro 2012 venues, where it hosted three of the group-stage games.  According to the official plans, the stadium has a total seating capacity of 34,915. Both clubs FC Lviv and Rukh Lviv use the stadium for home games.

Home field
It was the home field of FC Karpaty Lviv in 2011–12. But Karpaty only played five games at it and returned to its original home field due to the lease price. Another club Hoverla Uzhhorod also played a home game at the stadium, due to reconstruction of Avanhard Stadium in Uzhhorod.

Due to the conflict in their home city, Shakhtar Donetsk played its home games at the stadium between July 2014 and December 2016.

Overview 
Construction work began on 20 November 2008 and was completed by October 2011. The opening ceremony took place on 29 October, with a vast theatrical production dedicated to the history of Lviv and with the concert of the pop-star Anastacia. The first football match in the stadium was played on 15 November 2011, between Ukraine and Austria, ending with a score of 2–1. The first player to score a goal in the new stadium was Artem Milevskyi in the 16th minute (the second was an own goal and the third was scored by Marko Dević in the 91st minute).

Construction 

The original architectural firm for the project was Hochtief Construction, which had completed the Dnipro Arena. They made a presentation of their design on 21 May 2007 and proposed the name of Lemberg. The capacity of the stadium was originally planned to be 32,000, at a total cost of 70.4 million euros. It was planned that the stadium would be erected prior to 2010. The Hochtief representatives met with Andriy Sadovy and Myroslav Senyk (the head of the local regional council). Lviv officials claimed that the arena would cost 60 million euros, with 75% of the amount to be paid by an investor and 25% by the city government. In early 2008, Hochtief was replaced by the Austrian company AlpineBau. After almost a year of discussions, no works had begun and by 10 October 2008 AlpineBau had rejected the city's bid of 85 million euros, requesting at least 100 million.

On 23 October 2008, Lviv's administration contacted ISD (Industrial Union of Donets Basin). ISD is a major transnational industrial corporation in Eastern Europe, combining several industries including mining, construction, metallurgy, machine-building, and others. As time was limited, municipal officials held talks with another Austrian architectural company, Albert Wimmer, which designed the Hypo-Arena in Klagenfurt. Together with another local company Arnika, they came up with the design for the Ukrainian stadium. On 7 November, the Ministry of Economics appointed the project-construction company Azovinteks as the general contractor which immediately sent about one hundred of its workers, along with equipment, to Lviv. Azovinteks is based in Mariupol and is part of the ISD group.

The website, turnir.com.ua, referencing the declaration of the Ukrainian Cabinet of Ministers said that in April 2010 the government of Ukraine transferred the stadium into the sphere of control of the Ministry of Sport, Family, and Youth in order to stabilize and accelerate the construction of the stadium. Previously, the stadium was the property of the Lviv communal venture "Directorate for construction of a stadium in Lviv".

On 23 June 2010, the deputy chairman of the Lviv Oblast State Administration (LODA) Volodymyr Hubytsky informed the members of Lviv's council that the financing of Euro-2012 in the city of Lviv had been increased by five billion hryvna (from 5.3 to 10.3 overall). Hubytsky also said the government had confirmed the State Aiming Program for the preparation of the final stage of Euro-2012. The Lviv Oblast was assigned up to 16.4 billion hryvnas to completely cover the construction of the stadium and the city's airport. The head of the oblast administration also stated that rates of construction were increased and by August 30 the stands' carrying structure for the second tier would be installed. Hubytsky said that a consensus was found with the state company "Lviv Armored-Tank maintenance plant" which agreed to surrender part of its territory for the construction of approachable road access and various engineer networks for the stadium.

Construction financing
The deputy chairman said that 345 million hryvnas were spent on all construction projects in 2010, which was one and a half times more than the previous couple of years (216 million). The state program estimated the financing of all Euro-2012-related projects at 5.7 billion hryvnas, out of which 4 billion would come from the state budget, 1.35 from investors, and the rest .36 billion from the local budget. For the stadium only, the program assigned some 1.65 billion hryvnas, out of which .31 billion (.23 - state, .08 - Lviv) were released at the start of construction and 180 billion in 2010.

Plans 
The stadium's capacity is anticipated to be 34,915 spectators including 450 VIP sittings as well. All seats will be covered, while part of the roof assembly will be transparent to provide sufficient sunlight for the turf. The stadium's parking will be located underneath the arena which will consist of three levels. The parking for VIP will include 1,593 spaces. Parking for tele- and radio-media agencies will include. There also will be parking for the disabled and special elevators will provide passage to seats that are also designed and reserved to accustom the necessary personnel.

concert-halls, 
VIP clubs and restaurants
media-center
various training centers
administration offices
offices with a restaurant

Location and transportation 

Roads
The stadium is located in the southern part of Lviv city, near the intersection of the city's beltway M10/M06 and the route E471/M06 (locally, Stryiska Street) (more info). Note that the city's beltway is part of the route E40 that connects Dresden, Wroclaw, Rzeszów, Lviv, Kyiv, and Kharkiv. The location of the stadium is part of the Sykhiv municipal raion of Lviv, while the stadium is situated right next to the Sykhiv residential massif. The stadium is located next to a hippodrome.

Airport
The easiest access to the Lviv International Airport is by the beltway and the route M11. The airport lies northwest from the stadium.

Metro/trams
The city of Lviv is famous for its trams network. Since Ukraine won the bid for the Euro-2012 there were discussions on extending the network to the southern edge of the city under the name Trams to Sykhiv, as well as revival of the idea of a local subway system. Neither went forward due to "money vacuuming" out of the local budget. On 1 December 2009, the city of Lviv opened a line of a railbus that ran from Sykhiv to Pidzamche stopping at the Lviv Rail Terminal as well. However, on 15 June 2010, the line was closed down due to being unprofitable.

Map on the European road network in Ukraine

Other stadiums in Lviv
There are two other major stadiums in the city. One of them is the Ukraina Stadium which is leased to FC Karpaty Lviv until 2018. Ukraina Stadium is also one of the main alternative stadiums of the Ukraine national football team. Another major stadium in Lviv is the SKA Stadium. Both Ukraina and SKA are located in much closer proximity to the centre of Lviv than Arena Lviv.

UEFA Euro 2012 matches

The stadium was one of the venues for the UEFA Euro 2012. Three group B matches were played there (with the other matches in that group played at Metalist Stadium, Kharkiv).

The following matches were played at the stadium during the UEFA Euro 2012:

2018 World Cup qualifications disqualification
On 27 September 2013, FIFA Disciplinary Committee adopted a decision about disqualification of the stadium starting from 27 September 2013 and throughout the whole period of preliminary qualification for the 2018 FIFA World Cup.

Gallery

See also
Lviv Danylo Halytskyi International Airport

References

External links

 Official website 
 Stadion.lviv.ua – website about «Arena Lviv» 
 Photo and webcam from stadium 
 Two web cameras at city council website  
  Informational Center - Ukraine 2012

UEFA Euro 2012 stadiums in Ukraine
Football venues in Lviv
FC Shakhtar Donetsk
Sports venues completed in 2011